Dangerous Lies is a 2020 American psychological thriller film, directed by Michael Scott from a screenplay by David Golden. It stars Camila Mendes, Jessie T. Usher, Jamie Chung, Cam Gigandet, Sasha Alexander and Elliott Gould. It was released on April 30, 2020, by Netflix. In October 2020, Dangerous Lies was nominated for People's Choice Awards in the drama movie category.

Plot
Katie and Adam are a young married couple struggling to pay their bills. Katie works as a waitress while Adam is going to school. One night, an attempted robbery takes place in the diner where Katie works. Adam manages to fight off the robbers. Katie finds another job as a caregiver for Leonard, an elderly wealthy man who grows close to her. After she tells him about her financial struggles, Leonard insists on helping her out with money, but Katie asks him to give Adam a job instead as his gardener, which he does.

One day, a real estate agent, Hayden, appears and expresses interest in buying the house. When Katie tells him it's not for sale, Hayden starts to watch them closely. Soon after, Leonard writes Katie a $7,000 check. Katie does not want to accept it, but Adam convinces her to use the check to pay the bills that are due and pay back Leonard the rest.

The next day, Katie and Adam arrive at Leonard's home to find him dead, leaving Katie devastated. The couple finds a large amount of cash in a trunk and, after a small dispute, agrees to keep it without notifying the police. At Leonard's funeral, they learn from his lawyer, Julia, that Leonard left Katie his estate and all his possessions.

Katie and Adam move into Leonard's house, but soon they are pursued by the highly motivated Hayden, who threatens Katie. At the same time, Detective Chesler becomes suspicious of Adam, and starts to investigate Leonard’s death and the robbery at the diner.

After talking to the detective, Katie becomes suspicious of Adam.  Katie, wanting to confront him, looks for him at the house.  She searches the entire property and ends up finding a secret room in a shed.  She then finds Ethan (Leonard's previous gardener) long dead of a gunshot wound with a bag of diamonds. Katie and Adam realize that Ethan was Hayden’s partner in crime, and Hayden killed him to get his share of the diamonds. Ethan, mortally wounded, had fled to Leonard’s house, where he died. Hayden knows the diamonds are hidden somewhere in the house and is eager to find them. They decide to flee together. While Adam is getting ready, Hayden shows up and holds Katie at gunpoint, asking for the diamonds.

Hayden and Adam exchange gunfire, and both are killed. Julia arrives, and Katie tells her that Hayden was the one who killed Leonard with an overdose of his medication. Julia reaches for Hayden's gun and holds Katie at gunpoint, revealing that she is part of the plot. She demands the diamonds, but Katie tells her Adam hid them somewhere, and she doesn't know where. Detective Chesler arrives in time and shoots Julia dead.

Four months later, Detective Chesler talks to a pregnant Katie about how they searched for the diamonds in the house but never found them. In the last shot, Katie turns the sprinklers on and leaves the garden. The water moves the soil aside, and the diamonds are shown to be buried under a tree, something Adam had hinted at as he died.

Cast

 Camila Mendes as Katie
 Jessie T. Usher as Adam
 Jamie Chung as Julia
 Cam Gigandet as Mickey Hayden
 Sasha Alexander as Detective Chesler
 Elliott Gould as Leonard

Production
In April 2019, it was announced Camila Mendes had signed to star in the film, with Michael Scott directing from a screenplay by David Golden, and Netflix distributing. In May 2019, Jessie T. Usher, Jamie Chung, Cam Gigandet, Sasha Alexander and Elliott Gould joined the cast.

Principal photography began in April 2019. and took place in Vancouver.

Release
The film was released on April 30, 2020.

Reception
 

David Rooney, at The Hollywood Reporter, felt the film was "riddled with dumb logic", and that the "cast is quite capable, though seldom much more than that." Justin Kirkland, for the review in Esquire, called it an "incoherent murder mystery" that "stumbled... clunkily through 90 minutes of flimsy narrative", though tearing apart the messright down to realizing that "the cut and size of these diamonds are about as valuable as a packet of geranium seeds"unintentionally made watching it "a treat".

In a slightly more favourable review, Nick Allen, writing at RogerEbert.com, gave the film two-and-a-half stars out of five, saying that it "looks strikingly good—starting with swift, neon-tinged introductory shots... something that’s then continually affirmed with inspired framing and camera movement throughout".

References

External links
 

2020 films
2020 thriller films
American thriller films
Films set in Chicago
Films shot in Vancouver
English-language Netflix original films
Films directed by Michael M. Scott
Films produced by Margaret H. Huddelston
Films produced by Stephanie Slack
Films with screenplays by David Golden
2020s English-language films
2020s American films